Argyll and Bute Hospital is a mental health facility in Lochgilphead, Scotland. The original building (sometimes referred to as the West House) is a Grade C listed building. The hospital is managed by NHS Highland.

History
The hospital, which was designed by David Cousin, opened as the Argyll District Asylum in 1863. It became the Argyll and Bute District Asylum in 1868.  A new block, designed by Peddie & Kinnear, (sometimes referred to as the East House) was added in 1883 and, after joining the National Health Service as the Argyll and Bute Hospital in 1948, a new 30-bed extension was added and officially opened by the Duchess of Kent in 1971. After the introduction of Care in the Community in the early 1980s, the hospital went into a period of decline and was closed to inpatients in 2016 and has since closed altogether. Although a Grade C listed property, the buildings are no longer maintained and in 2020 the 'East House', being unsafe, was demolished.

References

Hospital buildings completed in 1863
Hospitals established in 1863
1863 establishments in England
Psychiatric hospitals in Scotland
NHS Scotland hospitals
Hospitals in Argyll and Bute